The enzyme phorbol-diester hydrolase (EC 3.1.1.51) catalyzes the reaction 

phorbol 12,13-dibutanoate + H2O  phorbol 13-butanoate + butanoate

This enzyme belongs to the family of hydrolases, specifically those acting on carboxylic ester bonds.  The systematic name is 12,13-diacylphorbate 12-acylhydrolase. Other names in common use include diacylphorbate 12-hydrolase, diacylphorbate 12-hydrolase, phorbol-12,13-diester 12-ester hydrolase, and PDEH.

References

 

EC 3.1.1
Enzymes of unknown structure